John Gano (July 22, 1727– August 10, 1804) was a Baptist minister, soldier, patriot, and Revolutionary War chaplain who allegedly baptized his friend, General George Washington. He was also notable for his bravery at the Battle of White Plains and crossing the Delaware River with General Washington.

Gano served as the first chaplain of the Kentucky Legislature in 1798. He founded the Gano political family, which included several generations of politicians and military officers.

Biography

Early life 

Gano was raised as a Presbyterian. His father was a descendant of French Calvinists (Huguenots) and his mother of English Baptists. After a powerful conversion experience, John Gano eventually became a Calvinist Baptist as a young man after a period of intense study. Gano left the family farm to study at Princeton University (then the College of New Jersey) but left before graduating. Gano was ordained as pastor of the Scotch Plains, New Jersey, Baptist Church on May 29, 1754. In 1760, he became the founding pastor of what later became the First Baptist Church in the City of New York. Gano served as pastor of the New York Church until 1787, however, he made long itinerant trips evangelizing throughout the thirteen colonies, asserting I... had a right to proclaim free grace wherever I went. Gano travelled throughout the South, Middle Atlantic States, and New England, sometimes being away from home for as long as two years. In 1764, Gano joined several others as an original fellow or trustee for the chartering of the College in the English Colony of Rhode Island and Providence Plantations (the former name for Brown University, originally a Baptist school).

Revolutionary War

During the American Revolution, Gano served as a soldier and a chaplain for the Continental Army. On October 28, 1776 Gano was present at the Battle of White Plains. He was stationed on Chatterton Hill with the 19th Infantry Regiment who were suffering heavy losses from the British. He walked in front of the troops while under fire and encouraged them not to retreat but to keep fighting. He wrote in his memoirs saying "My station in time of action I knew to be with the surgeons, but in this battle I somehow got in the front of the regiment, yet I durst not quit my place for fear of dampening the spirits of the soldiers or of bringing on myself the imputation of cowardice." It was after this battle he earned the nicknames "The Hero of Chatterton Hill" and "The Fighting Chaplain".  

On December 26, 1776, Gano participated in George Washington's famous crossing of the Delaware River. Gano was also present at the Battle of Trenton that followed. In the Chaplains and Clergy of the Revolution it states "He (Gano) crossed the Wintry Delaware with the army when it made its fearful midnight march on Trenton, and shared in the dangers of the battle that followed". Gano was chosen by General Washington to say a prayer marking the official end of the American Revolutionary War in 1783.

Post-war career 

After the War, Gano returned to his congregation in New York. On May 1, 1784 Gano was elected to the Board of Regents of the University of the State of New York alongside John Jay and Alexander Hamilton. By 1787, Gano moved to Kentucky where he would live at until his death in 1804. On June 17th, 1793 future Vice-President Aaron Burr wrote Gano a letter congratulating a friend of Gano's named John Edwards (1748-1837) for getting elected to the Kentucky Senate.

On November 9th, 1798 Gano was elected as the first Chaplain for the Kentucky Legislature as stated in the Journal of the Kentucky House of Representatives "In Senate: Resolved that the Rev. John Gano be appointed chaplain to the general assembly; in which they request the concurrence of this house." He was also a member of the Society of Cincinnati.

Death

Gano passed away on August 10th, 1804 and is buried in the Daughters Of The Revolutionary War Section of the Frankfort Cemetery in Frankfort, Kentucky just beyond Daniel Boone's grave. Before his death, Gano wrote and published an autobiography of his life.

Descendants 

Gano's descendants include billionaire Howard Robard Hughes Jr., whose mother was Allene (Gano) Hughes; Rev. Stephen Gano; Admiral Roy Alexander Gano; Confederate States of America General Richard Montgomery Gano, chemist Francis Gano Benedict, and Union Generals Stephen Gano Burbridge and William Price Sanders.

Alleged baptism of George Washington
In 1889 two of Gano's grandchildren claimed in an affidavit that Gano's eldest daughter told them that Gano had baptized Washington by immersion at Valley Forge when he was one of Washington's chaplains.

The story is rejected by a portion of secular historians. Dr. William Grady in his book "What Hath God Wrought" subtitled, "A Biblical Interpretation of American history" believes the account to be authentic.
Washington biographer and uncle of Howard Hughes, Rupert Hughes, researched the matter and determined that Rev. Gano served with George Clinton's army, not with Washington's, that the location is sometimes given as Valley Forge and sometimes as the Potomac, that there is no documentation of Gano ever being at Valley Forge, that there is nothing in Gano's own correspondence or his biography to suggest that the event took place, and that none of the 42 reputed witnesses ever documented the event. 

Gano Chapel at William Jewell College in Missouri is named after John Gano, and displays a painting of Gano baptizing Washington. The school takes no stance on whether the baptism of Washington actually took place. The chapel also contains a sword owned by the Marquis de Lafayette that Washington purportedly gave to Gano.

Washington's church, Anglican, believed in infant baptism and his christening is recorded as taking place on April 5, 1732, about six weeks after he was born.

References

External links

John Gano's Grave
Revolutionary War Chaplaincy
Painting of John Gano Baptizing George Washington (At bottom of page.)
Brown University Charter
The Society of the Cincinnati
The American Revolution Institute

Bibliography
Gano, John. "A Chaplain of the Revolution: Memoirs of the Rev. John Gano." Historical Magazine, 5 (November 1861), pp. 330–335.
Wolever, Terry. "The Life & Ministry of John Gano - Volume I." Springfield, MO: Particular Baptist Press, 1998.
John Gano, Biographical memoirs of the late Rev. John Gano, of Frankfort (Kentucky): formerly of the city of New York (Printed by Southwick and Hardcastle for J. Tiebout, 1806).

1727 births
1804 deaths
Brown University people
Princeton University alumni
University and college founders
People from Hopewell Township, Mercer County, New Jersey
Baptist ministers from the United States
Clergy in the American Revolution
People of the Province of New York
Religious leaders from New York City
American military chaplains
American Revolution chaplains
Huguenot participants in the American Revolution
Baptists from New York (state)